Panamint may refer to:

People
 Timbisha, a native American tribe also known as Panamint
 Timbisha language, also known as Panamint language

Places 
 Panamint City, a ghost town in California known for its past mining activity
 Panamint Range, a mountain range in the northeastern part of Mojave Desert, California
 Panamint Springs, an unincorporated community in Inyo County, California
 Panamint Valley, a California valley at the northeastern part of Mojave Desert

Animals 
 Panamint alligator lizard
 Panamint chipmunk
 Panamint kangaroo rat
 Panamint rattler

Plants 
 Panamint beardtongue
 Panamint butterfly bush
 Panamint cryptantha
 Panamint daisy
 Panamint dudleya
 Panamint liveforever
 Panamint mariposa lily
 Panamint milkvetch
 Panamint Mountain buckwheat
 Panamint Mountain lupine
 Panamint penstemon
 Panamint plume
 Panamint rock goldenrod

Language and nationality disambiguation pages